E. roseum may refer to:
 Epilobium roseum, a plant species in the genus Epilobium
 Eriogonum roseum, the wand buckwheat, a wild buckwheat species

See also
 Roseum (disambiguation)